The national flag of the Philippines is a horizontal bicolor flag with equal bands of royal blue and crimson red, with a white, equilateral triangle at the hoist. In the center of the triangle is a golden-yellow sun with eight primary rays, each representing a province. At each vertex of the triangle is a five-pointed, golden-yellow star, each of which representing one of the country's three main island groups—Luzon, Visayas (though originally referring to the island of Panay), and Mindanao. The white triangle at the hoist represents liberty, equality, and fraternity. A unique feature of this flag is its usage to indicate a state of war if it is displayed with the red side on top, which is effectively achieved by flipping the flag upside-down.

Design

Construction 
The flag's length is twice its width, giving it an aspect ratio of 1:2. The length of all the sides of the white triangle are equal to the width of the flag. Each star is oriented in such manner that one of its tips points towards the vertex at which it is located. Moreover, the gap-angle between two neighbors of the 8 ray-bundles is as large as the angle of one ray-bundle (so 22.5°), with each major rays having double the thickness of its two minor rays. The golden sun is not exactly in the center of the triangle but shifted slightly to the right.

Color 

The shade of blue used in the flag has varied over time, beginning with the original color described as Azul Oscuro (Spanish, "dark blue"). The exact nature of this shade is debated, but a likely candidate is the blue on the Cuban flag, which a theory says influenced the Philippine flag's design. The colors of the flag were first standardized by President Ramón Magsaysay, upon the recommendation of the Philippine Heraldry Committee (PHC) dated January 24, 1955. Specifically, the colors adopted were Old Glory Red (Cable No. 70180), National Flag Blue (Cable No. 70077), Spanish Yellow (Cable No. 70068), and White (70001) by the Reference Guide of the Textile Color Card Association of the United States. In 1985, President Ferdinand E. Marcos through Executive Order No. 1010, s. 1985 instructed the National Historical Institute "to take the necessary steps to restore the original color of the First Philippine Flag". In late May, the NHI adopted Oriental Blue (Cable No. 80176) for the new national flag, but this was later rescinded by President Corazon C. Aquino after the 1986 People Power Revolution that removed him from power in favor of pre-1985 National Flag Blue. For the 1998 centennial celebration of Philippine independence, the Flag and Heraldic Code of the Philippines (Republic Act. 8491, s. 1998) was passed, designating Royal Blue (Cable No. 80173) as the official variant to be used from 1998 to present.

The flag's colors are specified and codified under Republic Act 8491, s. 1998 signed on February 12, 1998, in terms of their cable number in the system developed by the Color Association of the United States. The official colors and their approximations in other color spaces are listed below:

Symbolism 

In the 1850s, both Manila and Iloilo, the islands' largest ports, had maritime flags used for navigation in the Philippine seas. Both maritime flags were swallowtail flags with red and blue stripes, respectively, which are now both part of the Philippine flag. The Philippine national flag has a rectangular design that consists of a white equilateral triangle, symbolizing liberty, equality and fraternity; a horizontal blue stripe for peace, truth, and justice; and a horizontal red stripe for patriotism and valor. In the center of the white triangle is an eight-rayed golden sun symbolizing unity, freedom, people's democracy, and sovereignty. Each ray represents a province with significant involvement in the 1896 Philippine Revolution against Spain; these provinces are Manila, Bulacan, Cavite, Pampanga, Morong (modern-day province of Rizal), Laguna, Batangas, and Nueva Ecija (some sources specify other provinces as alternatives to some of these). However, according to the Declaration of Independence and a research by Ateneo de Manila University Professor Ambeth Ocampo, the rays of the sun symbolized the first eight provinces of the Philippines which was declared under martial law during the Philippine Revolution (Batangas, Bulacan, Cavite, Manila, Laguna, Nueva Ecija, Pampanga and Tarlac). Three five-pointed stars, one at each of the triangle's points, stand for the three major island groups: Luzon, Visayas (originally referring to Panay Island) and Mindanao.

The flag's original symbolism is enumerated in the text of the independence proclamation, which makes reference to an attached drawing, though no record of the drawing has surfaced.  The proclamation explains the flag as follows:

The symbolism given in the 1898 Proclamation of Philippine Independence differs from the current official explanation. According to the document, the white triangle signifies the emblem of the Katipunan, the secret society that opposed Spanish rule. It says the flag's colors commemorate the flag of the United States as a manifestation of gratitude for American aid against the Spanish during the Philippine Revolution. It also says that one of the three stars represents the island of Panay, which recent historical interpretations say was "representative of the entire Visayas region".

History

Historical flags of the Philippine Revolution 

It has been common since the 1960s to trace the development of the Philippine flag to the various war standards of the individual leaders of the Katipunan, a pseudo-masonic revolutionary movement that opposed Spanish rule in the Philippines and led the Philippine Revolution. However, while some symbols common to the Katipunan flags would be adopted into the iconography of the Revolution, it is inconclusive whether these war standards can be considered precursors to the present Philippine flag.

The first flag of the Katipunan was a red rectangular flag with a horizontal alignment of three white Ks (an acronym for the Katipunan's full name, Kataas-taasang Kagalang-galangang Katipunan ng mga Anak ng Bayan – Supreme and Venerable Society of the Sons of the Nation). The flag's red field symbolized blood, as members of the Katipunan signed their membership papers in their own blood.

The various leaders of the Katipunan, such as Andrés Bonifacio, Mariano Llanera, and Pío del Pilar, also had individual war standards.

Current flag 

The Philippine National Flag was designed by Emilio Aguinaldo It was first displayed in the Battle of Alapan on May 28, 1898, after the Spaniards were defeated and surrendered to Aguinaldo.

The flag was formally unfurled during the proclamation of independence on June 12, 1898, in Kawit, Cavite. However, a Manila Times article by Augusto de Viana, Chief History Researcher, National Historical Institute, mentions assertions in history textbooks and commemorative rites that the flag was first raised in Alapan, Imus, Cavite, on May 28, 1898, citing Presidential Proclamation No. 374, issued by then-President Diosdado Macapagal on March 6, 1965. The article goes on to claim that historical records indicate that the first display of the Philippine flag took place in Cavite City, when General Aguinaldo displayed it during the first fight of the Philippine Revolution.

The original design of the flag adopted a mythical sun with a face influenced by The Republics of the Rio de la Plata, Argentina and Uruguay, which in turn represent Inti the Incan Sun-god; a triangle, representing the Katipunan which inspired by the Eye of Providence in the Great Seal of the United States and the Masonic Triangle and which enshrined Liberté, Égalité, Fraternité of the French Revolution; the stripes and colors derived from the American flag. The particular shade of blue of the original flag has been a source of controversy. Based on anecdotal evidence and the few surviving flags from the era, historians argue that the colors of the original flag was influenced by the flags of Cuba and Puerto Rico.

During the session of the Malolos Congress, Aguinaldo presented the symbolism of the official flag to the members, delegates and representatives of the assembly as follows:

The original flag that was first hoisted on May 28, 1898, and unfurled during the Declaration of independence on June 12, 1898, is being preserved at the Gen. Emilio Aguinaldo Museum in Baguio. There were plans to restore the flag by replacing the worn-out portion but the idea was abandoned because matching threads could not be found. The flag is more elaborate than the flag which is currently in use. It bears the embroidered words, Libertad, Justicia and Igualdad (Liberty, Justice, and Equality) on one side of the flag and Fuerzas Expedicionarias del Norte de Luzon (Expeditionary forces of Northern Luzon) on the other

Hostilities broke out between the Philippines and the United States in 1899. The flag was first flown with the red field up on February 4, 1899, to show that a state of war existed. Aguinaldo was captured by the Americans two years later, and swore allegiance to the United States.

With the defeat of the Philippine Republic, the Philippines was placed under American colonial rule and the display of the Philippine flag and other flags and banners associated with the Katipunan were declared illegal by the Flag Act of 1907. This law was repealed on October 24, 1919. With the legalization of display of the Philippine flag, the cloth available in most stores was the red and blue of the flag of the United States, so the flag from 1919 onwards adopted the "National Flag blue" color. On March 26, 1920, the Philippine Legislature passed Act. No 2928 on March 26, 1920, which legally adopted the Philippine flag as the official flag of the Philippine Islands. Up until the eve of World War II, Flag Day was celebrated on annually on October 30, commemorating the date the ban on the flag was lifted.

The Commonwealth of the Philippines was inaugurated in 1935. On March 25, 1936, President Manuel L. Quezon issued Executive Order No. 23 which provided for the technical description and specifications of the flag. Among the provisions of the order was the definition of the triangle at the hoist as an equilateral triangle, the definition of the aspect ratio at 1:2, the precise angles of the stars, the geometric and aesthetic design of the sun, and the formal elimination of the mythical face on the sun. The exact shades of colors, however, were not precisely defined. These specifications have remained unchanged and in effect to the present. In 1941, Flag Day was officially moved to June 12, commemorating the date that Philippine independence was proclaimed in 1898.

The flag was once again banned with the Japanese invasion and occupation of the Philippines beginning in December 1941, to be hoisted again with the establishment of the Second Republic of the Philippines, a client state of Japan. In ceremonies held in October 1943, Emilio Aguinaldo hoisted the flag with the original Cuban blue and red colors restored. The flag was initially flown with the blue stripe up, until President José P. Laurel proclaimed the existence of a state of war with the Allied Powers in 1944. The Commonwealth government-in-exile in Washington, D.C. continued to use the flag with the American colors, and had flown it with the red stripe up since the initial invasion of the Japanese. With the combined forces of the Filipino & American soldiers and the liberation of the Philippines in 1944 to 1945, the flag with the American colors was restored, and it was this flag that was hoisted upon the granting of Philippine independence from the United States on July 4, 1946.

Chronology

Proposals

Ninth ray for the flag's sun

Proposals to add a ninth ray to the sun of the Philippine flag dates as early as 1969, when the Ninth Ray historical reform movement started at the University of the Philippines in Diliman, Quezon City. The symbolism of the ninth ray varies by proponent.

As representative of a ninth province
Prior to the 1998 independence centennial celebrations, the provincial government of Zambales lobbied that the sunburst design accommodate a ninth ray, reasoning that their province was also in a state of rebellion in 1896. The Centennial Commission however refuted this change, based on research by the National Historical Institute. In August 2003, then Foreign Affairs Secretary Blas Ople also lobbied for a ninth ray, saying that Quezon should be added. He reasons that the first uprising against the Spaniards happened at the foot of Mount Banahaw which was led by Hermano Pule in 1841.

As representative of an ethnic group
In December 1987, congressman Alawadin Bandon Jr. of Tawi-Tawi proposed the addition of a ninth ray to the Philippine flag's sun to represent "Muslim participation" in the Philippine Revolution, arguing that "As a Muslim I am assaulted by a feeling of alienation in being excluded from the symbolic narration of the great history of the country." Senator Aquilino Pimentel Jr. later expressed the same view, filing a Senate Bill seeking the addition of a ninth ray representing Filipino Muslims in March 1988.

In 2008, Senator Richard Gordon filed Senate Bill No. 2590 which aimed to amend the Flag and Heraldic Code of the Philippines. This measure was later superseded by Senate Bill No. 3307 which was sponsored by Senator Francis Escudero and approved in September 2009. The bill was sent to the House of Representatives for concurrence with House Bill 6424. Both S.B. No. 3307 and H.B. 6424 was reconciled by the Bicameral Conference Committee in September 2009. President Gloria Macapagal-Arroyo, however, vetoed the measure.

, a proposal from the Ninth Ray movement  intends the additional ray to represent the Muslim and indigenous people of the country, including the Moro people, who kept colonizers away from their lands.

In June 2018, Gordon renewed his campaign to get his proposal passed into law.

Fourth star

Emmanuel L. Osorio, one of the founders of the Ninth Ray movement, also came up with a proposal adding not only a ninth ray to the flag's sun but adding a fourth star to the flag, representing North Borneo (present-day Sabah), a territory claimed by the Philippines but currently under Malaysian sovereignty. The flag's triangle is changed into a rectangle to accommodate the fourth star. According to Osorio, the star representing Sabah in his proposed flag was added "in principle" and said the flag proposal seeks to express the Ninth Ray movement's view that "if we get Sabah, then it could be represented by the star".

Crescent moon
There was a proposal to add a crescent moon during the administration of President Fidel V. Ramos in a lead up to the 1998 Philippine Centennial. Ramos directed Education Secretary Ricardo Gloria in 1995 to form a commission of scholars to research on the possible modification of the flag. The crescent is meant to represent the Moro community.

Usage

Display

The flag should be displayed in all government buildings, official residences, public plazas, and schools every day throughout the year. All other places as may be designated by the National Historical Commission as such. The days of May 28 (National Flag Day) and June 12 (Independence Day) are designated as flag days, during which all offices, agencies and instrumentalities of government, business establishments, institutions of learning and private homes are enjoined to display the flag. But in recent years, the flag days are now from May 28 to June 30 yearly to promote patriotism and to celebrate the nation's independence.

The display of the Philippine flag in cockpit arenas, casinos, disco venues, night and day clubs, gambling joints and "places of vice or where frivolity prevails" is illegal.

When displaying the Philippine flag with another flag in a crossed position, the former should hang on the left side of the observer and its staff should be displayed over the staff of the second flag. The display of two crossed Philippine flags is not permissible. In the case of the Philippine flag's display on a stage or platform such as in a speech, the flag's staff should be positioned on the right side and in front of the speaker and all other secondary flags displayed on the speaker's left.

Permanent display

Original named sites
By law, the Philippine flag must be permanently hoisted and illuminated at night at the following locations:

Additional sites
The National Historical Commission of the Philippines (formerly the National Historical Institute) as per Republic Act. 8491 can also designate additional sites where the Philippine flag should be displayed permanently.

Half-mast

The flag may be flown at half-mast as a sign of mourning. Upon the official announcement of the death of the president or a former president, the flag should be flown at half-mast for ten days. The flag should be flown at half-mast for seven days following the death of the vice president, the chief justice, the president of the Senate or the speaker of the House of Representatives.

The flag may also be required to fly at half-mast upon the death of other persons to be determined by the National Historical Institute, for a period less than seven days. The flag shall be flown at half-mast on all the buildings and places where the decedent was holding office, on the day of death until the day of interment of an incumbent member of the Supreme Court, the Cabinet, the Senate or the House of Representatives, and such other persons as may be determined by the National Historical Commission.

When flown at half-mast, the flag should be first hoisted to the peak for a moment then lowered to the half-mast position. It should be raised to the peak again before it is lowered for the day.

A bill was filed in 2014, to mandate the flying of the flag at half-mast as a tribute to public school teachers. Under the proposal the flag shall be flown at half-mast for at least five days at the school or district office the deceased teacher was assigned.

In wakes and burials
The flag may also be used to cover the caskets of the dead of the tanod, military and police, civil uniformed services, fire fighter, traffic enforcer, supreme court judge, Filipino governance servants, veterans of previous wars, national artists, uniformed rescuers, PNP SWAT and outstanding civilians as determined by the local government. In such cases, the flag must be placed such that the white triangle is at the head and the blue portion covers the right side of the casket. The flag should not be lowered to the grave or allowed to touch the ground, but should be solemnly folded and handed to the heirs of the deceased.

As a war ensign

The Philippines does not utilize a separate war flag; instead, the national flag itself is used for this purpose. To indicate a state of war, the red field is flown upwards and is placed on the right (i.e., the observer's left) when hung vertically. In times of peace, however, the blue area is the superior field. On this case, the Philippine flag is the only official country flag in the world that can be flipped when the country is at war. The red side-up orientation of the flag was used by the First Philippine Republic during the Philippine–American War from 1899 to 1901, by the Philippine Commonwealth during World War II from 1941 to 1945, by the Japanese-sponsored Philippine Republic when it declared war against the United Kingdom and the United States in 1944, by soldiers and civilians during the attempted coups d'états against President Corazon Aquino's administration, and by militants and rallyists during EDSA III.

Subdivision insignia

The usage of the Philippine flag as an element of a local government unit's (LGU; provinces, cities, and municipalities) seal is discouraged as per Memorandum Circular 92-30 of the Department of the Interior and Local Government. The usage of the flag is permissible if the flag itself has been part of the LGU's history such as in the case of Kawit, Cavite which is the site of the declaration of Philippine independence.

In intellectual property
The Philippine Flag itself is not eligible to be trademarked according to the Intellectual Property Office of the Philippines (IPOPHIL) since the flag is "owned by the public" in line with prohibitions on the flag's usage stated in Republic Act 8491. The Paris Convention for the Protection of Industrial Property, which the Philippines is a member of, also prohibits the registration of the state flags of its members as trademark. However both small and large businesses in the Philippines have used elements of the Philippine flag for their intellectual property. When it comes to this concern, the IPOPHIL has allowed businesses to use elements of the flag to invoke the national symbol as long as the intellectual property is neither a "true representation" of the Philippine flag nor a "modification that would amount to defacement of the flag".

Prohibited acts

According to Republic Act 8491 itself, it shall be prohibited:
a) To mutilate, deface, defile, trample on or cast contempt or commit any act or omission casting dishonor or ridicule upon the flag or over its surface;
b) To dip the flag to any person or object by way of compliment or salute;
c) To use the flag:
1) As a drapery, festoon, tablecloth;
2) As covering for ceilings, walls, statues or other objects;
3) As a pennant in the hood, side, back and top of motor vehicles;
4) As a staff or whip;
5) For unveiling monuments or statues; and
6) As trademarks, or for industrial, commercial or agricultural labels or designs.
d) To display the flag:
1) Under any painting or picture;
2) Horizontally face-up. It shall always be hoisted aloft and be allowed to fall freely;
3) Below any platform; or
4) In discothèques, cockpits, night and day clubs, casinos, gambling joints and places of vice or where frivolity prevails.
e) To wear the flag in whole or in part as a costume or uniform;
f) To add any word, figure, mark, picture, design, drawings, advertisement, or imprint of any nature on the flag;
g) To print, paint or attach representation of the flag on handkerchiefs, napkins, cushions, and other articles of merchandise;
h) To display in public any foreign flag, except in embassies and other diplomatic establishments, and in offices of international organizations;
i) To use, display or be part of any advertisement or infomercial; and
j) To display the flag in front of buildings or offices occupied by aliens.

The Act mandates that violators shall, upon conviction, be punished by fine or imprisonment.

Relevant customs

Pledge

The Pledge of Allegiance to the Philippine flag (distinct from the Patriotic Oath of Allegiance) should be recited while standing with the right hand with palm open raised shoulder high. Individuals whose faith or religious beliefs prohibit them from making such pledge are permitted to excuse themselves, but are required by law to show full respect when the pledge is being rendered by standing at attention.

The law makes no statement regarding the language in which the pledge must be recited, but the pledge is written (and therefore recited) in the Filipino language.

Flag anthem

Spanish, Tagalog and English versions of the national anthem have been given official status throughout Philippine history. However, only the most recent and current "Filipino" version is officially recognized by law. The Flag and Heraldic Code, approved on February 12, 1998, specifies, Lupang Hinirang, "The National Anthem shall always be sung in the national language within or without the country"; violation of the law is punishable by a fine and imprisonment.

National Flag Day

The National Flag Day in the Philippines is celebrated every May 28, the very day of the 1898 Battle of Alapan. The official National Flag flying period starts from May 28 and ends on Independence Day, June 12, every year, although the flying period for the flag in homes, businesses and public establishments may start on a specified day of May (to be given by the National Historical Commission of the Philippines) and may last until June 30.

See also 

 Coat of arms of the Philippines
 List of flags of the Philippines
 Philippine coastwise emblem

Notes

References

External links

 
 The Official Website of the Republic of the Philippines
 
 
 How to properly display the Philippine flag.
 History of the Philippine Flag: 
Philippines – historical flags of 20th Century,  flagspot.net
Filipino Flag – Learn Now FilipinoFlag.net (archived from the original  on 2012-06-23)
Watawat – Flags and Symbols of the Pearl of the Orient Seas 
History of the Philippine Flag, Philippines Presidential Museum and Library
Origin of the Symbols of our National Flag , Philippines Presidential Museum and Library
Flags and Banners of the Colonial Era in the Philippines, Philippines Presidential Museum and Library.

National symbols of the Philippines
 
Philippines
Philippines
Philippines
Philippines